DW1 may refer to:

Digimon World
Dragon Warrior
Dynasty Warriors (1997 video game)